Idiots Deluxe is a 1945 short subject directed by Jules White starring American slapstick comedy team The Three Stooges (Moe Howard, Larry Fine and Curly Howard). It is the 85th entry in the series released by Columbia Pictures starring the comedians, who released 190 shorts for the studio between 1934 and 1959.

Plot
Moe is on trial for assaulting Larry and Curly. Moe appeals to the judge (Vernon Dent), claiming he is a sick man who was instructed by his doctor to maintain peace and quiet. This peace is broken by Larry and Curly who are loudly rehearsing their "The Original Two-Man Quartet" routine performing "She'll Be Coming 'Round the Mountain". Moe cracks, and wraps Curly's trombone slide around the quartet's necks. Realizing Moe is in bad shape, Larry and Curly decide to take their ailing leader on a hunting trip to relieve his stress. Moe agrees, and the Stooges start packing.

No sooner do they arrive in an empty cabin when a hungry bear devours some eggs and potatoes while Moe has his back turned. His nerves double frayed, Moe asks Larry and Curly to pursue the bear. One thing leads to another, and the bear ends up behind the wheel of the Stooges' car, and ultimately wrecks it.

Back in the courtroom, Moe ends his story by concluding that he must go back to bed for six additional months. The judge takes pity on him, and finds him not guilty. The judge then returns Moe's axe, and Moe immediately goes after Larry and Curly with it.

Production notes
Idiots Deluxe was filmed on October 5–9, 1944, the last short film produced that year. The title is a satire on Idiot's Delight, a play by Robert E. Sherwood and later an MGM movie of the same title with Norma Shearer and Clark Gable. Idiots Deluxe marks a change in the title screens, most notably featuring the Greco-Roman comic mask of the Muse Thalia in the upper left-hand corner. This new format would remain in place for the remainder of the Stooges shorts run at Columbia Pictures. The film is a remake of Oh, My Nerves, starring Monte Collins and Tom Kennedy. It would be remade with the Stooges again in 1957 as Guns a Poppin, using minimal stock footage. The initial plotline of a person going on a retreat to heal an illness was originally done by Laurel and Hardy in the 1934 film Them Thar Hills.

One notable gag was the Stooges' unorthodox cuisine. Idiots Deluxe shows Larry and Curly putting almost every known condiment onto slices of bread but, not surprisingly, they are never shown actually eating the whole bread (partly because Moe interrupts them before they can). Moe then pours honey and ketchup on bread, declaring "If there's anything I like better than honey and ketchup, it's bologna and whipped cream—and we haven't got any!" Like Larry and Curly, Moe also does not eat his concoction, though he is seen biting a small piece of the crust off.

Curly's illness
At Moe's insistence, Curly Howard entered a Cottage Hospital at Santa Barbara, California in January 1945 and was found to have serious hypertension, obesity and retinal hemorrhage. The next short film produced, If a Body Meets a Body, was shot five months after Idiots Deluxe in March 1945 shortly after he suffered a minor stroke. His remaining performances with the team were lackluster and displayed the effects of his illness.

References

External links 
 
 

1945 films
1945 comedy films
American black-and-white films
Films directed by Jules White
The Three Stooges films
Columbia Pictures short films
1940s English-language films
1940s American films